Philotas, son of Carsis, was a Thracian, who may have married the daughter of a Macedonian aristocrat named Philotas.  He was one of the pages basilikoi paides in the service of Alexander the Great, who were induced by Hermolaus and Sostratus to join in the conspiracy against the king's life. He was stoned to death together with the other accomplices.

References
Who's Who in the Age of Alexander the Great by Waldemar Heckel 

Royal pages of Alexander the Great
Executed ancient Thracian people
Conspirators against Alexander the Great
People executed by Alexander the Great
People executed by stoning